Mário Mrva (born 16 February 1999) is a Slovak professional footballer who plays for Ružomberok as a defender.

Club career

MFK Ružomberok
Mrva made his Fortuna Liga debut for Ružomberok at City Aréna against Spartak Trnava on 29 November 2019. He had completed the entire fixture which had concluded with a 2:0 defeat, after two goals by Kubilay Yilmaz.

References

External links
 MFK Ružomberok official profile 
 Futbalnet profile 
 
 

1999 births
Living people
Sportspeople from Ružomberok
Slovak footballers
Slovakia youth international footballers
Association football defenders
MFK Ružomberok players
4. Liga (Slovakia) players
3. Liga (Slovakia) players
2. Liga (Slovakia) players
Slovak Super Liga players